Lúčka may refer to several places in Slovakia.

Lúčka, Levoča District
Lúčka, Rožňava District
Lúčka, Sabinov District
Lúčka, Svidník District